Composition No. 165 (for 18 instruments) is a live album by composer and conductor Anthony Braxton with the University of Illinois Creative Music Orchestra recorded in Illinois in 1992 and released on the New Albion label.

Reception

The AllMusic review by "Blue" Gene Tyranny called it "Wonderful acoustic music that winds its way through many textures and energy levels, not reducible to a simple description. Enjoyable, as well as music of a grand vision".

Track listing
All compositions by Anthony Braxton.
 "Composition No. 165 (for 18 instruments)" – 50:05

Personnel
University of Illinois Creative Music Orchestra, conducted by Anthony Braxton 
Paul Martin Zonn – alto saxophone, clarinet, slide saxophone
 Graham Kessler – alto saxophone, clarinet
Andrew Mitroff – tenor saxophone, flute
Kevin Engel – tenor saxophone, bassoon, clarinet
Mark Barone – baritone saxophone, bass clarinet
Thomas Tait, Jeff Helgesen, Judd G. Danby – trumpet
Erik Lund, Douglass Farwell, Keith Moore – trombone
Jesse Seifert-Gram – tuba
Tom Paynter – piano
Mark Zanter – guitar
Drew Krause – synthesizer
Adam Davis – bass
Justin Kramer, Tom Sherwood – percussion

References

Anthony Braxton live albums
1993 live albums